Charles Borromeo is the patron saint of a number of Catholic churches:

United States
 Mission San Carlos Borromeo de Carmelo, in Carmel-by-the-Sea, California
 St. Charles Borromeo Church (North Hollywood), in Los Angeles, California
 St. Charles Borromeo Church (Bridgeport, Connecticut), in the Roman Catholic Diocese of Bridgeport
 St. Charles Borromeo Catholic Church or St. Charles of the Valley Catholic Church and Rectory, in Hailey, Idaho
 St. Charles Borromeo Church (Destrehan, Louisiana), in the Archdiocese of New Orleans
 St. Charles Borromeo Church (Waltham, Massachusetts), in Middlesex County
 St. Charles Borromeo Roman Catholic Church (Detroit, Michigan), in Wayne County
 St. Charles Borromeo's Church (Dover Plains, New York), in Dutchess County
 St. Charles Borromeo Church (Greece, New York), in Monroe County
 St. Charles Borromeo's Church (New York City), in Manhattan 
 St. Charles Borromeo Church Complex (Woonsocket, Rhode Island), in Providence County
 St. Charles Borromeo Catholic Church, (Fort Wayne, Indiana), in the Roman Catholic Diocese of Fort Wayne–South Bend, Indiana

Other places
 St. Charles Borromeo Church, Antwerp, Belgium
 St. Charles Borromeo Cathedral, Joliette, in Quebec, Canada
 St Charles Borromeo, Hull, East Riding of Yorkshire, England
 St Charles Borromeo Church, Westminster, in the Diocese of Westminster, London, England
 St. Charles Borromeo Cemetery Church, Vienna

See also 
 St. Charles' Church (disambiguation)
 Karlskirche (disambiguation)
 San Carlos Cathedral (disambiguation)
 San Carlo (disambiguation), includes a number of churches dedicated to Charles Borromeo
 Saint Charles Borromeo Seminary (disambiguation)